The 1980 season was Molde's 8th season in the top flight of Norwegian football and their first since their promotion from 2. divisjon in 1979. This season Molde competed in 1. divisjon (first tier) and the Norwegian Cup.

In the league, Molde finished in 10th position, 11 points behind winners Start and were relegated to 2. divisjon.

Molde participated in the 1980 Norwegian Cup. On 6 August, they were eliminated by Fredrikstad after a 1–2 defeat at Fredrikstad Stadion in the fourth round.

Squad
Source:

Friendlies

Competitions

1. divisjon

Results summary

Positions by round

Results

League table

Norwegian Cup

Squad statistics

Appearances and goals
Lacking information:
Appearance statistics from 1. divisjon round 1 (at home against Fredrikstad) and round 17 (away against Fredrikstad) are missing.
Goalscorers from 1. divisjon round 10 (3 goals against Bodø/Glimt) and round 17 (2 goals against Fredrikstad) are missing.
Appearance statistics and one goalscorer from Norwegian Cup round 1 (against Valder)  are missing.

|}

Goalscorers

See also
Molde FK seasons

References

External links 
nifs.no

1980
Molde